Rožni Vrh is a settlement in the hills north of Celje in eastern Slovenia. The area is part of the traditional region of Styria. It is now included with the rest of the City Municipality of Celje in the Savinja Statistical Region.

References

External links
Rožni Vrh on Geopedia

Populated places in the City Municipality of Celje